Kaja Norbye (born 19 May 1999) is a Norwegian alpine skier.

She competed in five events at the 2018 World Junior Championships, a 7th place in the combined event her best result, and then in four events at the 2019 World Junior Championships where she won a bronze medal in the giant slalom and a silver medal in the combined event.

She made her FIS Ski Jumping World Cup debut in March 2019 in Spindleruv Mlyn, collecting her first World Cup points with a 22nd place. She repeated this placement in December 2019 in Courchevel.

She represents the sports club IL Heming.

References 

1999 births
Living people
Alpine skiers from Oslo
Norwegian female alpine skiers